Smile is a 2022 American supernatural psychological horror film written and directed by Parker Finn (in his feature directorial debut), based on his 2020 short film Laura Hasn't Slept. The film stars Sosie Bacon as a therapist named Rose Cotter, who, after witnessing the bizarre suicide of a patient, goes through increasingly disturbing and daunting experiences, leading her to believe what she is experiencing is supernatural. It also stars Jessie T. Usher, Kyle Gallner, Kal Penn, and Rob Morgan, as well as Caitlin Stasey playing the same character she played in the short film.

A feature adaptation of Finn's short was announced in June 2020, and the cast was added in October 2021. Principal photography began that month in New Jersey and ended in November. Originally set for release on the streaming service Paramount+, distributor Paramount Pictures opted to release the film theatrically after positive test screenings.

Smile premiered at Fantastic Fest on September 22, 2022, and was released in the United States on September 30. The film received generally positive reviews from critics, who praised the visuals, themes, cinematography  and Bacon's performance, but criticized some of its jump scares and noted its similarities to other horror films such as The Ring and It Follows. It was a box office success, grossing over $217 million worldwide against a $17 million budget.

Plot
At a psychiatric ward, therapist Dr. Rose Cotter meets with Laura Weaver, a graduate student who witnessed her art history professor die by suicide a few days earlier. Laura claims that an entity taking the form of smiling people has been terrorizing her and has told her that she is going to die. Soon after, Laura stumbles to the floor and begins screaming. After Rose calls for help, she sees Laura standing up and smiling. With a shard of a broken vase, Laura kills herself by slitting her throat. Rose later sees her manic patient Carl smiling and shouting that she is going to die. Rose calls for nurses to restrain him, only to see he was asleep the whole time. Concerned for Rose's mental well-being, her supervisor Dr. Morgan Desai gives her a week off.

In the following days, the hallucinations continue, making Rose seem unhinged and dangerous to people around her. She visits her former therapist, Dr. Madeline Northcott, who suggests that her problems stem from her abusive and mentally ill mother, whose death from an overdose she witnessed as a child. At her nephew's birthday party, Rose's gift had been replaced by her dead cat, horrifying the children. She sees a party guest smiling at her and falls onto a glass table, ending the party in chaos. She begins to suspect she has fallen victim to a curse.

Upon learning that Laura's professor was grinning at her before his death, Rose visits his widow, Victoria, and learns that he had witnessed a suicide shortly before his own. Rose asks her ex-boyfriend Joel, a police detective, to go through police records. They find several cases where someone witnessed a suicide, then a few days later died by suicide in front of someone else, who continued the pattern. 

Rose tries to patch things up with Holly and Trevor, but only makes things worse as she sees Trevor is only concerned with himself after calling Madeline to help her get over the situation. Feeling betrayed, she angrily tells him off, saying that she had trusted him. Holly compares Rose's behavior to their late mother, but an enraged Rose responds that Holly knows nothing of what happened.

Rose's hallucinations intensify. Joel discovers that nearly all the witnesses died within a week of seeing the previous suicide, thus finding out himself Rose is cursed. The exception was Robert Talley, who instead murdered someone else. Rose and Joel visit him in jail, where he claims that the entity feeds on trauma, and the only way to escape it is to kill someone in front of a witness to traumatize them, passing the entity to them. Rose angrily rejects the option and leaves.

She is confronted at home by the entity in Madeline's form, where it gleefully warns her that she is running out of time. She impulsively drives to her hospital with a knife, planning to murder Carl in front of someone to pass the entity to them, but decides she cannot go through with it. Morgan notices her with the knife, but she speeds away, prompting him to alert the police.

Rose drives to her abandoned family home, realizing that she cannot pass on the entity if she remains alone. Rose confronts the entity in the form of her mother, and it is revealed that as a child, Rose found her mother as she was dying from a drug overdose, but decided not to get help. The entity attacks Rose, who has a hallucination.

Soon Joel pulls up, having tracked Rose's phone. The entity rips off its own skin to reveal its true form – a skinless humanoid creature whose body is made from the previous victims that it consumed, with multiple sets of malformed jaws, nesting within an enormous, smiling mouth. The sight of the entity's true form is so frighteningly traumatic to Rose that it causes her to have a nervous breakdown and she falls into a trauma-induced paralysis. Having succeeded at finally breaking Rose's mind, the entity proceeds to feed on her culminated trauma by forcing itself inside her body through her mouth and merges with her psyche. Joel breaks down the front door only to see Rose set herself on fire with a smile, passing the curse onto him.

Cast

Production
In June 2020, Parker Finn was tapped by Paramount Pictures to write and direct a feature adaptation of his own short film Laura Hasn't Slept, which saw a young woman seeking the help of her therapist desperate to rid herself of a recurring nightmare. Earlier in March that year, the short film won the Special Jury Recognition Prize for South by Southwest's Midnight Short category.
In September 2021, the film was announced under the title Something's Wrong with Rose with Sosie Bacon cast as the titular character. The following month, Jessie T. Usher, Kyle Gallner, Rob Morgan, Kal Penn, Judy Reyes, Gillian Zinser, and Caitlin Stasey joined the cast.

Principal photography began on October 11, 2021, in New Jersey, including in the city of Hoboken, and wrapped on November 24, 2021.  Some filming locations included the  Murphy Varnish Lofts, Rutgers New Jersey Medical School in Newark and Lewis Morris Park in Morristown.

Editing and post-production were completed in May 2022. Visual effects was done by the-Artery and was supervised by Yuval Levy and Vico Sharabani, when the film was simply retitled Smile. The film's score was composed by Cristobal Tapia de Veer. For practical effects, Finn recruited Alec Gillis and Tom Woodruff Jr. of Amalgamated Dynamics, who he described as a major influence in wanting to be a horror filmmaker for their work in films such as Aliens.

Release
Smile had its world premiere at Fantastic Fest on September 22, 2022, followed by screenings at Beyond Fest on September 27. It was released in the United States on September 30, 2022, by Paramount Pictures. Paramount Pictures President and CEO Brian Robbins said that Smile was originally slated for a streaming-only release on Paramount+, but the studio eventually decided to release the film theatrically because of strong results from test screenings.

The film was released for VOD platforms including Paramount+ on November 15, 2022, with a DVD, Blu-ray, and 4K UHD set released on December 13, 2022.

Marketing
The trailer and poster were released on June 22, 2022. Brad Miska of Bloody Disgusting described the footage as "pretty generic", but said it stood out due to its similarities to Ringu and The Ring. Shania Russell at /Film compared the film to The Ring, It Follows and Truth or Dare and wrote, "It's all very familiar and probably not too hard to imagine how the movie will progress, but the scares will make or break the experience, and based on the trailer, Smile is more than promising."

During several Major League Baseball games the weekend before the film's release, a viral marketing stunt occurred, as the studio's marketing team purchased seats behind home plate, with actors smiling maniacally into the camera for the pitcher-batter shot for extended periods of time. Some of the actors wore shirts with the name and logo of the film on the front.

Reception

Box office 
Smile grossed $105.9 million in the United States and Canada, and $111.5 million in other territories, for a total worldwide gross of $217.4 million.

In the United States and Canada, Smile was released alongside Bros, and was projected to gross $16–20 million from 3,645 theaters in its opening weekend. The film made $8.2 million on its first day, including $2 million from Thursday night previews. It went on to debut to $22.6 million, topping the box office and slightly overperforming its projections, while being the biggest debut of September 2022. The film made $18.4 million in its sophomore weekend, remaining atop the box office. The 18% second weekend drop was the second-smallest ever for a horror film behind Get Outs 15% in February 2017, and marked the best non-holiday hold of the pandemic era. Although it was dethroned by newcomer Halloween Ends in its third weekend the film continued to hold well, making $12.6 million. On November 9, 2022, it became only the third R-rated film released in the pandemic era to gross $100 million domestically, as well as becoming the highest-grossing R-rated horror film worldwide during the pandemic.

Critical response
On the review aggregator website Rotten Tomatoes, the film holds an approval rating of 80% based on 183 reviews, and an average rating of 6.6/10. The site's critical consensus reads, "Deeply creepy visuals and a standout Sosie Bacon further elevate Smiles unsettling exploration of trauma, adding up to the rare feature that satisfyingly expands on a short." On Metacritic, the film has a weighted average score of 68 out of 100, based on 32 critics, indicating "generally favorable reviews". Audiences polled by CinemaScore gave the film an average grade of "B–" on an A+ to F scale, while those at PostTrak gave it an overall 69% positive score, with 53% saying they would definitely recommend it.

Marisa Mirabal of IndieWire gave the film a grade of B−, noting its plot's similarities to films such as It Follows, The Ring, Oculus and Final Destination. She wrote: "Smile navigates unhealed trauma through a supernatural lens and mischievous juxtaposition, despite feeling like a shadow of other stories", and added that it "delivers a captivating and claustrophobic mental hellscape that will cause one to both grimace and grin." Tasha Robinson of Polygon wrote: "Smile is often a gimmicky, even corny horror movie, packed with so many jump-scares that the sheer pile-on borders on laughable... But no matter how excessively the legitimate scares pile up, they're startling and convincing. The editing and music are impressively tuned for maximum impact whenever the slow-burning tension resolves with an abrupt, ugly surprise. All of which makes Smile an efficient ride, if an unusually unrelenting one."

Katie Rife of RogerEbert.com gave the film 2.5 out of 4 stars, writing: "In padding out the concept from an 11-minute short into a nearly two-hour movie, Smile leans too heavily not only on formulaic mystery plotting, but also on horror themes and imagery lifted from popular hits like The Ring and It Follows." Kevin Maher of The Times wrote: "There are some nice jump scares and Bacon is charismatic but it's achingly derivative and dull", and gave the film 2 out of 5 stars. Jeffrey M. Anderson of Common Sense Media also gave the film 2 out of 5 stars, writing: "The image of a creepy, sinister smile is so primal and so chilling that it might have inspired something truly penetrating, but, sadly, this horror movie is content to fall back on noisy jump scares."

Related media

Prequel short film

Laura Hasn't Slept was written directed by Parker Finn in 2019, and later debuted at South by Southwest in 2020. The positive reception at the film festival, resulted in Paramount Pictures commissioning the filmmaker for a feature film adaptation, though it was later revealed that the movie is a continuation of the original story.

The premise follows Laura as she recounts a series of horrific dreams and hallucinations where she is being pursued by smiling man, to her therapist. As she does so she begins to realize that she isn't where she thinks she is, that she is again experiencing an extra-sensory episode, and that the counselor she is confiding in is actually the entity that has been tormenting her. While the ending of the short film seems to indicate that the character dies, Laura later appears Smile where she seeks the help of Dr. Rose Cotter; indicating that the resolution to Laura Hasn't Slept was a continued hallucination. The character ultimately sets in motion the events of the full length film.

The short movie later received a wide release, as a bonus feature on the home video media of Smile; Paramount marketed the feature as a "Smile original short film". Finn additionally called the short "the origin" of Smile.

Potential sequel
Following the release of Smile, from November through December of 2022 during interviews writer/director Parker Finn stated that he had intentionally left portions of the first movie ambiguous, with various plotlines unresolved while expressing interest in exploring those details a potential sequel film. The filmmaker stated that while additional installments may explore the backstory of the entity, he would like to keep its mysterious nature intact. He noted that a follow-up movie would be notably different from the first, stating that he believed "there is still a lot of interesting stuff to explore in the world of Smile. ...I’d want to make sure that there’s a new, exciting, fresh way into it that the audience isn’t anticipating. I also want to find some new ways to scare them and unnerve them."

References

External links
 
 
 

2022 films
2022 directorial debut films
2022 horror films
2020s American films
2020s English-language films
2020s monster movies
2020s psychological horror films
2020s supernatural horror films
American monster movies
American psychological horror films
American supernatural horror films
Demons in film
Features based on short films
Films about curses
Films about psychiatry
Films about shapeshifting
Films about spirit possession
Films about suicide
Films produced by Wyck Godfrey
Films set in New Jersey
Films shot in New Jersey
Films shot in Newark, New Jersey
Paramount Pictures films
Paramount Players films
Temple Hill Entertainment films